Ivan Kirpa (born March 6, 1978 in Roslavl, Russia) is a Russian welterweight boxer from Saint Petersburg, Russia.

He won his first 19 fights, before losing to Bradley Pryce on points on May 8, 2003. Kirpa then won his next four fights against Tigran Saribekyan, Alexei Korobka, Sergey Zimnevich and then Jose Leonardo Corona, 32 months after his last bout.

External links
 

1978 births
Living people
Sportspeople from Smolensk
Russian male boxers
Welterweight boxers